Estádio Municipal Antônio Dias Navegantes is a stadium located in Tucuruí, Brazil. It is used mostly for football matches and hosts the home matches of Independente Atlético Clube de Tucuruí. The stadium has a maximum capacity of 8,000 people.

References

External links
Navegantão on OGol
Navegantão on Federação Paraense de Futebol

Independente Atlético Clube de Tucuruí
Football venues in Pará
Tucuruí
Sports venues completed in 1989
1989 establishments in Brazil